The French Site (22HO565) is an archeological site in Carroll County, Mississippi and Holmes County, Mississippi.  It was listed on the National Register of Historic Places in 1986.

References

Archaeological sites on the National Register of Historic Places in Mississippi
National Register of Historic Places in Carroll County, Mississippi
National Register of Historic Places in Holmes County, Mississippi